Richard Levine is a writer, director, actor and producer. He wrote and directed the film Submission (2017), starring Stanley Tucci, Kyra Sedgwick and Addison Timlin. The film is based on the best selling novel Blue Angel, by Francine Prose and premiered at the Los Angeles Film Festival. His first film,  Every Day (2010), starring Liev Schreiber, Helen Hunt, Eddie Izzard and Brian Dennehy, was a New York Times critic's pick.

Levine and his writing partner, Lynnie Greene, most recently wrote and executive produced the Epix series, The Truth About The Harry Quebert Affair, starring Patrick Dempsey, directed by Jean-Jacques Annaud as well as the Amazon Video pilot, The Interestings directed by Mike Newell.

He was a writer, director and executive producer of the Golden Globe Award winning series, Nip/Tuck, for all of its seven seasons as well as the Golden Globe Award nominated series, Boss, starring Kelsey Grammer. He wrote for and produced the Golden Globe Award nominated Masters of Sex and co-created the ABC series, Scoundrels, starring Virginia Madsen.

Acting 
As an actor, Levine graduated from the Juilliard School, and appeared on Broadway in Dracula (starring Frank Langella), Rumors (with Ron Leibman, Jessica Walter and Christine Baranski), Gyspy (starring Tyne Daly) and The Visit (with Jane Alexander). He most recently appeared in the film The Sea of Trees (2015) directed by Gus Van Sant.

References

External links 

Year of birth missing (living people)
Living people
American television producers
American television directors
American film directors
American male actors
American male screenwriters
Juilliard School alumni